Ribic is a spelling without diacritic of South Slavic surnames Ribič or Ribić, both literally meaning the occupation of fisherman. Notable people with these surnames include:
 
Esad Ribić,  Croatian comic book artist and animator
Nicholas Ribic, a.k.a. Nikola Ribić, a Canadian who fought in the Bosnian Serb Army prosecuted for hostage-taking
Tanja Ribič, Slovenian actress and singer
Vladimir Ribić, Serbian football player

See also

Rebić

Occupational surnames